The Annedal Church is a church building in Annedal in Gothenburg, Sweden. Belonging to the Gothenburg Annedal Parish of the Church of Sweden, construction begun in 1908 and the church was opened on Thanksgiving Day, 25 September 1910 by bishop Edvard Herman Rodhe.

References

External links

19th-century Church of Sweden church buildings
Churches in Gothenburg
Churches completed in 1910
Churches in the Diocese of Gothenburg